Firdavsbek Musabekov is a visually impaired Uzbekistani Paralympic swimmer. He represented Uzbekistan at the 2016 Summer Paralympics held in Rio de Janeiro, Brazil and he won one of the gold medals in the men's 100 metre breaststroke SB13 event. Oleksii Fedyna, representing Ukraine, also won a gold medal as both swimmers finished with a time of 1:04.94.

At the 2019 World Para Swimming Championships held in London, United Kingdom, he won the silver medal in the men's 100m breaststroke SB13 event.

He also represented Uzbekistan at the 2020 Summer Paralympics in Tokyo, Japan.

References

External links 
 

Living people
Year of birth missing (living people)
Place of birth missing (living people)
Uzbekistani male breaststroke swimmers
Paralympic swimmers with a vision impairment
Swimmers at the 2016 Summer Paralympics
Swimmers at the 2020 Summer Paralympics
Medalists at the 2016 Summer Paralympics
Paralympic gold medalists for Uzbekistan
Paralympic swimmers of Uzbekistan
Medalists at the World Para Swimming Championships
Paralympic medalists in swimming
S13-classified Paralympic swimmers
21st-century Uzbekistani people
Uzbekistani blind people